The Leeds School of Business is a college of the University of Colorado Boulder in the United States, established 1906. As of April 2022, the school reports an enrollment of over 3800 undergraduate students. In 2001, the college was named for the Leeds family, spearheaded by alumnus Michael Leeds of New York, who committed $35 million to the school.

History

What is today known as the Leeds School of Business began in 1906 as the College of Comm, a division of the College of Liberal Arts. The University of Colorado was one of the leaders in establishing a college of commerce, according to the Biennial Report of 1906-1908. The report noted that the distinction between the College of Commerce and the ordinary business college. "The man who is to be a leader in business must know something of law, economics, the markets of the world, and the location of available power and labor."

In 1922, the business program became the School of Business Administration and relocated to the basement of Guggenheim, the former law school building. The faculty was enlarged to a total of 15, and the school was on its way to become one of the university's first principal professional schools.

The business program was accredited by the Association to Advance Collegiate Schools of Business (AACSB), the accrediting body of business schools, in 1937. The AACSB recognition is only given to those schools that achieve and maintain established standards  with respect to curriculum, faculty, library resources, and financial support. At this point the business school was still without a real home. Classes were being held in several buildings across campus.

In 1960, the school began offering doctoral degrees in business, and by 1965 the success of the program prompted the University of Colorado Board of Regents to establish the Graduate School of Business to administer master's degrees. The school moved to its present location in 1970.

In October 2001, the Leeds family of New York made a $35 million commitment to the University of Colorado Boulder's business school, the country's seventh largest endowment to a business school. The school was renamed the Leeds School of Business in recognition of the gift.

From 2009- 2011  Manuel Laguna served as interim dean after Dennis Ahlburg accepted the presidency of Trinity University in San Antonio.

In January 2011 it was announced that David L. Ikenberry had been appointed dean of the Leeds School of Business. He had previously held the position of Associate Dean at the College of Business at the University of Illinois at Urbana-Champaign. He stepped down as Dean in 2016.  Sharon Matusik, a Leeds School professor of strategy and entrepreneurship now serves as the Dean.

In 2019 the school has: more than 55 tenure track faculty and 28 instructors; more than 3,400 undergraduates; over 200 full-time MBA students and 115 evening MBA students; and over 40 PhD students.

The newly expanded and renovated building for CU-Boulder’s school of business is named in honor of the Koelbel family, leaders in Colorado real estate development, construction and sales, in recognition of their long-time support of CU and the business school.  In August 2007, the newly renovated and expanded Koelbel building opened for classes. The old building was designed to hold 800 students, and had not been renovated in 38 years.

Undergraduate program

The Leeds School of Business offers only one undergraduate degree, a Bachelor's in Science of Business Administration, or a BSBA. A BSBA is offered with concentrations in Accounting, Finance,  Marketing, Management and Entrepreneurship, and Real Estate.  The four-year degree requires a combination of Arts and Sciences core classes, a set of Business Core classes, concentration specific classes and upper division business electives.

Certificate programs
In addition to major emphasis options, students may also fulfill requirements to earn a certificate in entrepreneurship, global business, quantitative finance, business leadership, business of sports, certificate in social responsibility and ethics, operations and information management.

Course offerings
Courses are offered in many aspects of business.  These include Accounting, Business Ethics, Entrepreneurship, Finance, International Business, Management, Marketing, Real Estate and Sustainability.

Graduate program

The Leeds School of Business graduate program offers graduate degrees in several areas.  The largest graduate area is the Leeds Masters in Business Administration, or MBA, program.  Leeds also offers Masters in Science, or MS, degrees in several business areas including accounting and finance.

List of deans 
The Leeds School of Business, originally known as the College of Commerce and later as the School of Business Administration, is currently led by Dean Sharon Matusik. Sharon is the 14th Dean and the first woman to be Dean at the school.

 1915-1932     Director Frederick A. Bushee    College of Commerce
 1932-1953     Dean Elmore Petersen    School of Business Administration
 1953-1957     Delbert J. Duncan    School of Business Administration
 1957-1964     Dean Lawrence D. Coolidge    School of Business Administration
 1964-1984     Dean William H. Baughn    School of Business Administration
 1984-1986     Dean Charles M. Lillis    School of Business Administration
 1986-1989     Dean Edward A. Johnson    School of Business Administration
 1989-1992     Dean J. Russell Nelson    School of Business Administration
 1992-1993     Dean Ralph “Bud” Sorenson    School of Business Administration
 1993-1999     Dean Larry D. Singell    School of Business Administration
 1999-2005     Dean Steven Manaster    School of Business Administration
 2005-2009     Dean Dennis A. Ahlburg    Leeds School of Business
 2011-2017     Dean David L. Ikenberry    Leeds School of Business
 2017-current Dean Sharon F. Matusik    Leeds School of Business

See also
List of United States business school rankings
List of business schools in the United States

References

External links
Leeds School of Business
The University of Colorado Boulder

Business schools in Colorado
University of Colorado Boulder
Educational institutions established in 1906
1906 establishments in Colorado